Felice Duffy is a New Haven, Connecticut-based defense attorney and public speaker with over 10 years of experience as a federal prosecutor, a role in which she worked to make neighborhoods safer, enforce drug and criminal penalties, support civil rights, and more. 
Prior to her position as an Assistant U.S. Attorney, she worked as an attorney at several firms (including Sullivan and Cromwell in New York City and Zeldes Needle & Cooper in Bridgeport, CT) and also as a federal judicial law clerk, athletic administrator, and Division 1 head soccer coach. In addition to graduating first in her class at Quinnipiac University School of Law, Duffy obtained her Masters and PhD degrees in Education and Sports Psychology from the University of Connecticut. Duffy has authored, among other things, a law review article on Title IX and has taught at Quinnipiac law school.
 
Prior to her position as an Assistant U.S. Attorney, she worked as an attorney at several firms (including Sullivan and Cromwell in New York City and Zeldes Needle & Cooper in Bridgeport, CT) and also as a federal judicial law clerk, athletic administrator, and Division 1 head soccer coach. In addition to graduating first in her class at Quinnipiac University School of Law, Duffy obtained her Masters and PhD degrees in Education and Sports Psychology from the University of Connecticut. Duffy has authored, among other things, a law review article on Title IX and has taught at Quinnipiac law school.
 
Duffy is a lifelong athlete and passionate about Title IX; her experience with this federal law is personal, as she was instrumental in filing a Title IX complaint to institute a varsity women's soccer team at the University of Connecticut. She went on to be the captain of this team, was a first team All-America player. She also served as head soccer coach at Yale University for 10 years  where she brought the team from the bottom to the top of the Ivy league, culminating in Yale's national ranking of 16. Duffy has been into the CT Soccer Hall of fame and the Northeast Women's Sports Hall of Fame.

She has been honored for her work toward the advancement of women, as well as her continued support of women's athletics. In 2007, Duffy was the recipient of the National Org. For Women Alice Paul Award for Advocacy for the Advancement of Women. In 2022, she received the Outstanding Professional Award from the University of Connecticut. She remains involved with outreach efforts to better her community and country.

References

Connecticut lawyers
Living people
Lawyers from New Haven, Connecticut
Year of birth missing (living people)
University of Connecticut alumni
UConn Huskies women's soccer players
American women's soccer players
American women's soccer coaches
Sullivan & Cromwell people
Women's association footballers not categorized by position